Richard Wallace Stubbs (born 7 October 1946) is a British-Canadian professor emeritus and writer on international politics. Stubbs taught at St. Francis Xavier University, Carleton University, and the University of Toronto before joining the Department of Political Science at McMaster University in 1990.

Stubbs is known for his book on the Malayan Emergency, Hearts and Minds in Guerrilla Warfare: The Malayan Emergency 1946-1960 (Singapore: Oxford University Press, 1989), which was republished in 2004 by Eastern University Press. The three editions of his coedited book with Geoffrey R. D. Underhill, Political Economy and the Changing Global Order (MacMillan, 1994; Oxford University Press, 2000, 2006), were closely associated with the rise of the British School of International Political Economy. He has also published on regionalism in East and Southeast Asia and on the developmental state in East Asia. His books on these subjects include Rethinking Asia's Economic Miracle: The Political Economy of War, Prosperity and Crisis (Palgrave Macmillan, 2005) and the co-edited volume with Mark Beeson, Handbook of Asian Regionalism (Routledge 2012).

Stubbs was President of the McMaster University Faculty Association from 2008 to 2009.

References

1946 births
Living people
People educated at Birkenhead School
People from Crosby, Merseyside
Academic staff of McMaster University
Academic staff of St. Francis Xavier University
Academic staff of Carleton University
Academic staff of the University of Toronto
Alumni of Aberystwyth University
Alumni of Lancaster University
University of Alberta alumni